John Bosco McDermott (born 1936 in Dunmore, County Galway) is an Irish former sportsperson.  He played Gaelic football with his local clubs Dunmore and Williamstown and was a member of the Galway senior inter-county team in the 1950s and 1960s.  McDermott later served as manager of the Galway team between 1993 and 1996.

References

 

1936 births
Living people
Galway inter-county Gaelic footballers
Gaelic football managers